Barbera is a red Italian wine grape variety.

Barbera may also refer to:

Places
Barberà del Vallès, a municipality of Catalonia
Barberà de la Conca, a municipality of Catalonia
Stadio Renzo Barbera, a football stadium in Palermo, Italy

People with the surname
Angelo Barbera, an American musician
Angelo La Barbera (1924–1975), an Italian Mafia member
Augusto Barbera (born 1938), an Italian law professor, politician and judge
Gioacchino La Barbera (born 1959), an Italian Mafia member
Héctor Barberá (born 1986), a Spanish motorcycle racer
Jason LaBarbera (born 1980), a Canadian ice hockey player
Jaume Barberà (born 1955), a Spanish director and TV presenter
Joe LaBarbera (born 1948), an American jazz musician
John LaBarbera (born 1945), an American jazz musician
Joseph Barbera (1911–2006), an American cartoonist
Mary Ellen Barbera (born 1951), an American lawyer and judge
Pat LaBarbera (born 1944), an American-Canadian jazz musician
Peter LaBarbera (born 1963), an American social activist
Rita Barberá Nolla (born 1948), a Spanish politician
Roberto La Barbera, an Italian paralympic athlete
Salvatore La Barbera (1922–1963), an Italian Mafia member

Other uses
Barbera (grapes), several other grape varieties also known as Barbera
Barbera d'Asti, an Italian red wine made from the grape variety 
Hanna-Barbera, an American animation studio

See also
 Barbara (disambiguation)
 Barberi, a name
 Barbero, a name